Origanates is a monotypic genus of North American dwarf spiders containing the single species, Origanates rostratus. It was first described by C. R. Crosby & S. C. Bishop in 1933, and has only been found in the United States.

See also
 List of Linyphiidae species (I–P)

References

Linyphiidae
Monotypic Araneomorphae genera
Spiders of the United States